Eupoecilia lata is a species of moth of the family Tortricidae. It is found in Sikkim, India.

References

Moths described in 1968
Eupoecilia